The FANG-YUAN Art Museum is an art museum in Xihua Borough, Jiangjun District, Tainan, Taiwan.

History
The museum building was originally constructed in 1944 as the Suisheng Clinic of Huang Ching-wu, the former head of township in the area. In 2008, the building was purchased by an entrepreneur Lin Chen-feng. He then rebuilt it to be a museum of fine arts.

Architecture
The building is a mixture of Taiwanese and Western architectural styles featuring the 4-section compound with corridors and arched winding cloisters. The front section of the building was constructed with Western architectural style and the back section is connected to Sanheyuan.

Exhibitions
The museums displays pottery and porcelain which are commonly used in the early days of Taiwan.

See also
 List of museums in Taiwan

References

External links

 

2008 establishments in Taiwan
Art museums established in 2008
Art museums and galleries in Taiwan
Museums in Tainan